The 1808 United States presidential election in South Carolina took place between November 4 and December 7, 1808, as part of the 1808 United States presidential election. The state legislature chose 10 representatives, or electors to the Electoral College, who voted for President and Vice President.

During this election, South Carolina cast its 10 electoral votes to Democratic Republican candidate and Secretary of State James Madison.

References

South Carolina
1808
1808 South Carolina elections